Mehboob Ali may refer to:
 Mehboob Ali (Uttar Pradeshi politician), Indian politician from the state of Uttar Pradesh.
Mehboob Ali (Rajasthani politician) (1931–2011), Indian politician in Rajasthan
Mehboob Ali (athlete) (born 1990), Pakistani sprinter
Mehboob Ali Kaiser, Indian politician who is a member of the 16th Lok Sabha from the Khagaria constituency (elected 2014)